"Yesterday" is a song by Shanice. It was the second single from Shanice's fourth studio album, Shanice and it was a released on July 20, 1999.

Music video
A music video was filmed for the song but was not released. However, rough draft of the video leaked in February 2008 which can be viewed on Shanice's YouTube channel.

Track listing

Promo CD Single
"Yesterday" (Album Version) - 3:49
"Yesterday" (Instrumental) - 3:49

Charts

References

Shanice songs
1999 singles
1999 songs
LaFace Records singles
Songs written by Shanice